Adam Akio Crystal (born in Oakland California, US) is an American  composer, violinist, and keyboardist known for his work in film score and contemporary classical music composition for modern dance and ballet.

Music career
Crystal is a prolific composer of contemporary classical music for modern dance and ballet. His commissioned work has been performed at The Guggenheim's Works & Process", the Vail International Dance Festival, and the Royal New Zealand Ballet In 2016 Crystal's orchestral piece "Rush Hour" premiered at Lincoln Center with choreography by Larry Keigwin and performed by Orchestra of St. Luke's and Paul Taylor Dance Company. In 2017 Crystal was commissioned to create a work with choreographer Ethan Stiefel for the Washington Ballet entitled "Frontier" as part of the JFK centennial celebration. It premiered in May 2017 at the Kennedy Center.

Crystal, originally trained as classical violinist, began playing keyboards for the NYC band Dopo Yume and later was the keyboardist for electroclash band Fischerspooner.

Music

Ballets
2011: Trio – choreographed by Larry Keigwin for the Works & Process at the Guggenheim
2011: Descent – choreographed by Brian Brooks Moving Company
2012: "Final Dress" - choreographed by Larry Keigwin for The Royal New Zealand Ballet
2014: "Canvas" - choreographed by Larry Keigwin
2015: "Dakini" - choreographed by Ethan Stiefel for Starz mini series Flesh and Bone
2015: "Rush Hour" - choreographed by Larry Keigwin for Paul Taylor's PTAMD
2016: "Green Mountain" - choreographed by Larry Keigwin for Green Box Arts Festival
2017: "Frontier" - choreographed by Ethan Stiefel for The Washington Ballet

Film and Television
2002: Slumming It: Myth and Culture on the Bowery 
2005: Smile for the Camera
2009: What's on Your Plate
2010: The Park
2011: Give Up Tomorrow
2012: Beginnings
2012: Drivers Wanted
2013: Matteo Garrone: The Player
2014: Selfie
2014: Born to Fly: Elizabeth Streb vs. Gravity
2015: This Is Happening
2015: Those People
2015: Flesh and Bone (original ballet score)
2016: So Good To See You
2016:  Almost Sunrise
2017: The Institute
2018: The Dawn Wall (SXSW: Winner of SXSW Audience Award)
2019: Bonding Season 1
2020: Bonding Season 2

Discography

Awards
2014 HMMA Nomination for best Documentary Score: Born to Fly: Elizabeth Streb vs Gravity
2014 Clio Award for Selfie

References

External links

1976 births
Living people
21st-century American composers
21st-century American keyboardists
Interlochen Center for the Arts alumni
Musicians from California